King of the Deathmatch is a professional wrestling tournament contested under hardcore rules.

King of Deathmatch tournaments
IWA King of the Death Match
IWA Mid-South King of the Deathmatch
Combat Zone Wrestling's Tournament of Death
XPW King of the Deathmatch Championship